Rubus humistratus is a Mesoamerican species of flowering plants in the rose family. It widespread across much of Mexico and Central America from Nuevo León to Costa Rica.

References

humistratus
Plants described in 1844
Flora of Mexico
Flora of Central America